Keith Norman Sutton (23 June 1934 – 24 March 2017) was the 97th Bishop of Lichfield from 1984 to 2003.

Early life and education
Sutton grew up in Balham, London. He attended Battersea Grammar School and won a scholarship to Cambridge to read English but changed to theology. He graduated from Jesus College, Cambridge, in 1959. He was a keen runner (national schoolboy sprint champion) and was a Cambridge Blue at tennis. Before attending Cambridge University he did his national service with the British Army where he was commissioned into the Sixth Armoured Division and spent time primarily in Germany.

Ministry
Sutton was ordained at Exeter Cathedral and served as a curate in Plymouth. In July 1985, he was sent by the Archbishop of Canterbury as a special envoy to support Archbishop Desmond Tutu who was facing threats of action by the South African government.
He was the Bishop of Kingston from 1978 to 1984, having served as principal of Ridley Hall from 1973 to 1978. Prior to his time at Ridley Hall he taught at Bishop Tucker Theological College in Mukono, Uganda, from 1968 to 1973 (now part of Uganda Christian University). He was chaplain of St John's College, Cambridge, from 1962 to 1967. In 1989 he became a member of the General Synod Standing Committee and became president of The Queens College in Birmingham and governor of St John's College, Durham. He wrote a Lent book, The People of God (1983).

Sutton retired to Cornwall and served as an honorary assistant bishop in the dioceses of Truro and Exeter.

Marriage and family
Sutton was married to Jean Sutton (née Geldard), deceased September 2000. They had three sons (Mark, Paul and Andrew) and one daughter (Jacqui).

References

External links 
 Interview at The Free Library

1934 births
2017 deaths
Alumni of Jesus College, Cambridge
Bishops of Kingston
Bishops of Lichfield
20th-century Church of England bishops
21st-century Church of England bishops
Staff of Ridley Hall, Cambridge